Oldenbüttel station, is a railway station in the municipality of Hambergen, in Lower Saxony, Germany. It is located on the Bremen–Bremerhaven line of Deutsche Bahn.

Services
 the following services stop at Oldenbüttel:

References

External links
 
 

Railway stations in Lower Saxony
Bremen S-Bahn